Yael Ron Ben-Moshe (born 14 November 1978) is an Israeli politician. She was a member of the Knesset for Blue and White between 2020 and 2022.

Biography
Born in kibbutz Ga'aton, Ron Ben-Moshe studied for bachelor's and master's degrees at Tel Aviv University. Married, with three children, she managed employment programmes for the Israel branch of the American Jewish Joint Distribution Committee and worked in the Prime Minister's Office. In 2015 she was appointed manager of a regional partnership of local authorities in the Western Galilee.

She was placed fortieth on the Blue and White list for the March 2020 elections. However, the alliance won only 33 seats. In November 2020 she was appointed CEO of the alliance. she entered the Knesset in December 2020 as a replacement for Ofer Shelah. She was re-elected to the Knesset in the March 2021 elections after being placed eighth on the Blue and White list.

For the 2022 elections Ron Ben-Moshe was placed fifteenth on the National Unity Party list (an alliance of Blue and White and New Hope), but lost her seat as it won only twelve seats.

References

External links

1978 births
Living people
Blue and White (political alliance) politicians
Israeli Jews
Israel Resilience Party politicians
Jewish Israeli politicians
Kibbutzniks
Members of the 23rd Knesset (2020–2021)
Members of the 24th Knesset (2021–2022)
Tel Aviv University alumni
Women members of the Knesset